Ross Parry News Agency is a national and international news agency based in Yorkshire. The company is owned by South West News Service.

History 
Ross Parry started life as an independent news agency based in Leeds, West Yorkshire, which was founded in 1981 by partners Jeff Ross and Dave Parry. It turned into an agency with great "calibre and reputation" in providing the national press with news stories and pictures.

In 2013, Ross Parry News Agency was acquired by SWNS along with Masons News in Cambridge. Parry chose to stay on as picture editor and as part of the takeover bid the news agency would keep its originally name. Parry said the union with SWNS "would take Ross Parry to a new level, providing an even better service from our region."

After Parry retired a year later, Glen Minikin took over the reins as picture editor. In Summer 2017, Charlotte Owen became news editor after taking over from Rebecca Penston.

In late 2017, SWNS announced Ross Parry would be part of their new dawn of content creating, which would "revolutionise" the industry. The company won a six-figure Google grant to help the content making process.

Present Day 
In 2018, Ross Parry's chief reporter Tom Kershaw, along with two other journalists, overturned an order to name a police officer after he was struck off for not reviewing CCTV footage correctly.

References 

News agencies based in the United Kingdom